Arthur S. De Vany (born August 29, 1937) is an American economist who has studied the Hollywood film industry and developed theories of evolutionary fitness focusing on nutrition and exercise in the paleo (caveman) manner. He is Professor Emeritus of Economics at the University of California, Irvine.

Education
De Vany earned his B.A. in economics at the University of California, Los Angeles (UCLA) in 1963; his M.A. in economics from UCLA in 1965; and his Ph.D. in economics from UCLA in 1970. He also trained at the Legal Institute for Economists at Emory University in 1982.

Motion picture economics
De Vany has researched motion picture economics, having created mathematical and statistical models of the dynamics of information to precisely describe the motion picture market in terms of kurtosis, skewness, wildness and uncertainty. His work has also covered other industries including water and energy.

His theses were collectively published in 2003 as Hollywood Economics: How Extreme Uncertainty Shapes the Film Industry. Using the motion picture industry's film budget and box office data provided by third-party information services such as Rentrak and Variety magazine, De Vany found that the historical relationship between a motion picture's cost and revenue converge to a group of stable distributions he describes as the Paretian distribution, i.e., the relationship between a motion picture's cost and revenue was wildly unpredictable compared to other investments.

In 1991, along with Ross Eckert, he published his Paramount Antitrust paper, an economic analysis of the landmark United States v. Paramount Pictures, Inc. decision, in which he found historical and economic reasons for the practices that were challenged by the Department of Justice, and in which most of his key ideas were expressed far before he confirmed them statistically. 

In 1996, along with W. David Walls, he published the Bose-Einstein paper in the Economic Journal. Using the Bose–Einstein statistics concept used for quantum physics, he showed the complex convergence toward the Pareto distribution during the theatrical run and the way word-of-mouth drove a theatrical run's almost chaotic behavior. He was able to show that the film industry was able to adjust to such phenomena using adaptive, exhibition contracts and decentralizing decisions to be allocated to the local exhibitor through the hold-over and rental terms of the contract.

In an article co-authored with W. David Walls and published in Journal of Economic Dynamics and Control, he also coined the phrase "superstar's curse" to describe the dilemma film producers face in hiring movie stars. Producers calculate the expected increase that a star will provide to a film's profit, then pay that star the difference. However, the returns of film are heavily skewed, such that the expected return (in statistical terms, the mean) is higher than the most common return (the mode). 80% of the time, the film will return less than the expected return. Thus, 80% of the time, the film will lose money.

Evolutionary fitness
De Vany has worked on the concept of evolutionary fitness (similar to the Paleolithic lifestyle). He outlines his approach in The New Evolution Diet: What Our Paleolithic Ancestors Can Teach Us about Weight Loss, Fitness, and Aging (December 2010). His ideas about fitness include a diet and fitness regime that promotes a more random behavior that mimics the natural way ancestral people lived in place of the steady and regular eating and sparse exercise that are the norm in Western societies. He follows a diet that mimics the diet of ancient humans during the Paleolithic period with carefully selected modern foods such as vegetables, lean meat and seafood, fresh fruits and nuts. He also advocates glucose restriction and intermittent fasting as methods to turn down the aging pathways.

Career
 Co-founder and Chief Scientist, Extremal Film Partners, Santa Monica, CA, 2007
 Member, Evolution, Complexity and Cognition Group, Free University of Brussels, 2010
 Professor of Economics and member of Institute for Mathematical Behavioral Sciences, University of California, Irvine, CA, 1984–2003
 Associate, Center for Computable Economics, UCLA, 1995–1998
 Professor, University of Houston, University Park, Houston, Texas, 1981–1984
 Professor, Simon Fraser University, Burnaby, B.C., Canada, 1980–1981
 Fellow, University of Chicago, Center for the Study of the Economy and the State, and the Law School, Chicago, Illinois, 1978–1979
 President and co-founder, Resources Research Corporation, College Station, Texas, 1977–1979
 Professor, Department of Economics, Texas A&M University, College Station, Texas, 1977–1979
 Associate Professor, Texas A&M University, Department of Economics, College Station, Texas, 1971–1977

Published research on motion picture economics
 De Vany, Arthur. "Uncertainty, waiting time and capacity utilization – a stochastic theory of product quality". Journal of Political Economy, 84: 523–541, 1976
 De Vany, Arthur. "Contracting in the movies when 'nobody knows anything'". In Victor Ginsburg, editor, Proceedings of the Rotterdam Conference on Cultural Economics, North-Holland, 2003
 DeVany, Arthur S. and Cassey Lee. "Motion pictures and the stable Paretian hypothesis". IMBS working paper, University of California at Irvine, 2000
 De Vany, Arthur S. and Cassey Lee. "Quality signals in information cascades and the dynamics of the distribution of motion picture box office revenues". Journal of Economic Dynamics and Control, 25: 593–614, 2001
 De Vany, Arthur S. and Ross Eckert. "Motion picture antitrust: the Paramount cases revisited". Research in Law and Economics, 14: 51–112, 1991
 De Vany, Arthur and Hank McMillan. "Markets, hierarchies, and antitrust in the motion picture industry". Working paper, Economics Department, University of California, Irvine, 1993
 De Vany, Arthur S. and W. David Walls. "Innovation tournaments: an analysis of rank, diffusion and survival in motion pictures". Paper presented, NBER Conference on New Products, Cambridge, MA, 1993
 
 De Vany, Arthur S. and W. David Walls. "Bose–Einstein dynamics and adaptive contracting in the motion picture industry". Economic Journal, 439(106): 1493–1514, 1996. [Reprinted in Hollywood Economics.]
 De Vany, Arthur S. and W. David Walls. "The market for motion pictures: Rank, revenue and survival". Economic Inquiry, 4(35): 783–797, November 1997. [Reprinted in Hollywood Economics.]
 De Vany, Arthur S. and W. David Walls. "Private information, demand cascades and the blockbuster strategy". IMBS working paper, University of California at Irvine, 2000. [Reprinted in Hollywood Economics.]
 De Vany, Arthur and W. David Walls. "Does Hollywood make too many R-rated movies? Risk, stochastic dominance, and the illusion of expectation". Journal of Business, 75(3): 425–451, April 2002. [Reprinted in Hollywood Economics.]
 De Vany, Arthur and W. David Walls. "Motion picture profit, the stable Paretian hypothesis, and the curse of the superstar". Journal of Economic Dynamics and Control, 2002. [Reprinted in Hollywood Economics.]
 De Vany, Arthur and W. David Walls. "Quality evaluations and the breakdown of statistical herding in the dynamics of box office revenues". IMBS working paper, University of California at Irvine, 2002. [Reprinted in Hollywood Economics.]
 De Vany, Arthur S. and W. David Walls. "Uncertainty in the movie industry: does star power reduce the terror of the box office?". Journal of Cultural Economics, 23(4): 285–318, November 1999. [Reprinted in Hollywood Economics.]

References

External links
 UC Irvine faculty page
 

1937 births
Living people
Economists from California
University of California, Irvine faculty
University of California, Los Angeles alumni
University of California, Santa Barbara faculty
University of Houston faculty
Academic staff of Simon Fraser University
Texas A&M University faculty
Place of birth missing (living people)
Paleolithic diet advocates
Economists from Texas